The Oblate Sisters of Providence (OSP) is a Roman Catholic women's religious institute, founded by Mother Mary Elizabeth Lange, OSP, and Rev. James Nicholas Joubert, SS in 1828 in Baltimore, Maryland for the education of girls of African descent. It was the first permanent community of Roman Catholic sisters of African descent in the United States. The Oblate Sisters were free women of color who sought to provide Baltimore's African American population with education and "a corps of teachers from its own ranks." The congregation is also a member of the Women of Providence in Collaboration.

History

Founding
James Nicholas Joubert was born in France, and working in Saint-Domingue, (Haiti), when he was forced by the Revolution to escape to the United States. Arriving in Baltimore, he entered St. Mary's Seminary to become a Sulpician priest. After his ordination, he was given charge of the black French-speaking Catholics of St. Mary's chapel. Finding he was making no headway as the children were having trouble reading and learning their catechism he had the idea of founding a school for the purpose of educating these children. In this he was encouraged by his two friends, Fathers Babade and Tessier.

He was introduced to two women of African descent who kept a small private school and had a hope of consecrating their lives to God. Father Joubert made known to them his plans for a school for girls of African descent and they offered to be at his service. Father Joubert proposed that they also form a religious institute as well as conducting a school. This idea would become St. Frances Academy in 1828.

With the approval of James Whitfield, Archbishop of Baltimore, a novitiate was begun. A little over a year later, on 2 July 1829, the first four sisters, Miss Elisabeth Lange from Santiago, Cuba, Miss Mary Rosine Boegues of Saint Domingue, Miss Mary Frances Balas of Saint Domingue, Miss Mary Theresa Duchemin of Baltimore made their vows.

Sister Mary Lange was chosen superior, and Rev. Father Joubert was appointed director. Pope Gregory XVI approved the institute on 2 October 1831 under the title of Oblate Sisters of Providence. The sisters opened other Catholic schools for African American girls in the city as well as teaching adult women in evening classes and opened a home for widows. The sisters educated youth and nursed the terminally ill during the cholera epidemic of 1832. They provided a home for orphans and sheltered the elderly. The sisters took in washing, ironing and mending to care for the "children of the house". The organization did not consider "previous condition of servitude a liability for Oblate membership" and eight of the forty women who joined in the antebellum years (1828-1860) had been slaves.

Expansion
In 1871 the sisters vacated the motherhouse on Richmond St. because the city needed the property. A new location was found on a knoll on what was then the outskirts of the city and a new motherhouse was built on Chase St. The sisters continued to operate an orphanage as well as a day and boarding school within the convent walls.

Foreign missions began in 1900 when the Oblates opened their first mission in Havana, Cuba. The OSPs established seven missions in Cuba but left in 1961 when the regime of Fidel Castro made it impossible for them to continue their work. In 1903 a convent and school opened on Old Providence Island in the western Caribbean. Due to extremely harsh conditions, the mission closed after fifteen months.

By 1910 the sisters conducted schools and orphanages at Baltimore, Washington, Leavenworth, St. Louis, and Normandy, Missouri. Eventually the institute founded schools in eighteen states. Some missions only lasted a few years while others endured and changed with the needs of the community.

Modern era 
By the 1950s there were over 300 Oblate Sisters of Providence teaching and caring for African American children. The Oblates had missions in the Dominican Republic and opened missions in Costa Rica in 1964, where they continue today.

The motherhouse remained on Chase Street in Baltimore until a new motherhouse was built in 1961 at 701 Gun Rd. in southwest Baltimore County. It is called Our Lady of Mount Providence and remains the motherhouse today. Several missions operated on the motherhouse property including Mt. Providence Junior College from 1963–1966. 

The sisters began a Child Development Center and Reading and Math Center in 1972 on the motherhouse property. The sisters continue to operate St. Francis Academy on Chase Street in Baltimore.

Bill and Camille Cosby donations 
In 2005, Camille Cosby (wife of Bill Cosby), an alumna of a school in Washington run by the Oblates, made a donation to the school to create an endowment that will pay the tuition for 16 students a year.

The Cosbys made another donation in 2012 to assist St. Frances Academy in building a community center in East Baltimore. The community center was originally named after her and her husband, but his name was removed after the revelation of multiple sexual offenses.

Charism
"The original inspiration of the Oblate Sisters of Providence is that gift of the Spirit so evident in the life of Mother Mary Lange.  This charism enables us, with total trust in God's Providence, to bring joy, healing and the liberating, redemptive love of the suffering Jesus to the victims of poverty, racism, and injustice despite contradictions, prejudice and pain."

Currently the institute has approximately eighty members. The Oblate Sisters continue in Baltimore, Maryland, Miami, Florida, Buffalo, New York, Alajuela and Siquirres, Costa Rica.

Motherhouse
The motherhouse houses the administrative offices, a health care unit, a novitiate (there is also a novitiate in Costa Rica), the Mother Lange Guild (supporting the cause for canonization of Mother Lange), and the Oblate Sisters of Providence Archives and Special Collections Library. Offices for the affiliated organizations of the National Oblate Sisters of Providence Alumni Association and Cojourners of the Oblate Sisters of Providence are also located at the Motherhouse.

See also
Oblate (religion)

References

External links
 Oblate Sisters of Providence
 National Black Catholic Congress bio & story
Mother Lange’s relics moved to motherhouse as sainthood cause advances

African-American history in Baltimore
African-American Roman Catholicism
Afro-Caribbean culture in the United States
Afro-Haitian culture
Christianity in Baltimore
Haitian-American culture in Maryland
Haitian-American history
Organizations based in Baltimore
Religious organizations established in 1829
Catholic female orders and societies
Catholic religious institutes established in the 19th century
1829 establishments in Maryland
History of women in Maryland
Oblate Sisters of Providence